The Virginia Capes are the two capes, Cape Charles to the north and Cape Henry to the south, that define the entrance to Chesapeake Bay on the eastern coast of North America.

In 1610, a supply ship learned of the famine at Jamestown when it landed at Cape Henry. 

The importance of Chesapeake Bay in American history has long made the Virginia Capes strategically significant, most notably in the naval Battle of the Chesapeake that was crucial to the American victory at the siege of Yorktown, effectively ending the American Revolutionary War. As a result, the area was heavily garrisoned, beginning with the construction of Fort Monroe and Fort Wool in 1819. The Virginia was attempting to break the Union blockade that was strangling the Confederacy.

During World War I, additional gun batteries were installed on Cape Henry at Fort Story and on Fisherman's Island near Cape Charles. During World War II, the coast artillery batteries at Fort Story were expanded and additional batteries were installed at Fort John Custis on Cape Charles to guard the entrance to Hampton Roads Harbor.

More recently, because of the close proximity of many military installations, including Naval Station Norfolk, Joint Base Langley-Eustis, Joint Expeditionary Base Little Creek–Fort Story, NAS Oceana, the Norfolk Naval Shipyard, and Newport News Shipbuilding, the Capes area has often been used for the initial trials of new Navy ships and for military training exercises.

References

Headlands of Virginia